The Northeast New Mexico Detention Facility is a privately operated medium-security state prison for men, located in Clayton, Union County, New Mexico.  The facility was financed and is owned by the Town of Clayton.  Operator GEO Group houses a maximum of 625 state inmates, under a contract with the New Mexico Corrections Department.

It opened in August 2008.

References

Prisons in New Mexico
Buildings and structures in Union County, New Mexico
GEO Group
2008 establishments in New Mexico